Bezdružice is a town in Tachov District in the Plzeň Region of the Czech Republic. It has about 900 inhabitants.

Administrative parts
Villages of Dolní Polžice, Horní Polžice, Kamýk, Kohoutov, Křivce, Pačín, Řešín and Zhořec are administrative parts of Bezdružice.

Geography
It lies in the Teplá Highlands. The territory is rich in small streams.

History

The first written mention of Bezdružice is from 1227. In 1360–1379, Bezdružice was owned by knight Bušek and it was in these times, when a small stone castle was built. In 1459, the village became a market town.

From 1520 to 1614, a deadly plague infected the town. During the Thirty Years' War, around 1646, the town and the castle were burnt down by the invading Swedish army. In 1712, Bezdružice was acquired by the Löwenstein princely family. At that time, the old and new castles were already standing on the site of the original castle.

In 1808, another plague hit the town, in 1809, a fire burnt down many parts of the town, and in 1815, a windstorm ravaged Bezdružice.

The town became more popular when a railway was introduced to the town. The railway quickly gentrified the town. However, the population declined during and after World War II, mainly following the expulsion of local German inhabitants.

In 1949, Bezdružice lost the town status and was incorporated into the Tachov District. On 10 October 2006, the municipality regained its town status.

Sights
Bezdružice Castle is a Gothic castle built by the Kolowrat family before 1330. The castle was partly demolished in the 18th century, but it was remodeled in the Baroque style.

The first mention of the Church of the Assumption of the Virgin Mary is from 1515, however the current church was built in 1710–1711, after the old one was demolished.

Notable people
Kryštof Harant (1564–1621), nobleman
Louis Weinert-Wilton (1875–1945), German writer

Gallery

References

External links

Cities and towns in the Czech Republic
Populated places in Tachov District